Hapsburg is a brand of absinthe sold by Wine & Spirit International Limited of London. Hapsburg Absinthe was established in 1999.

Hapsburg contains the herb wormwood (Artemisia absinthium). The Hapsburg Absinthe line includes five products: Hapsburg Classic, X.C, Flavoured Absinthe, Irish Cream Absinthe, and La Magnifique.

Hapsburg Classic Absinthe 
Hapsburg Classic is made from a traditional recipe and infused with Artemisia Absinthium (grand wormwood). It has an alcohol content of 72.5%.

Absinthe X.C
The X.C range consists of four flavored Absinthes:  Original,  Cassis,  Red Summer,  and Black Fruits.  They have an Alcohol content of 89.9%.

Absinthe Shot Flavors 
Hapsburg Absinthe 33% flavored shots include six flavors: apple, blackberry, peach, espresso, vanilla, and liquorice.

Irish Cream Absinthe 
Hapsburg Absinthe Irish Cream is made from Irish cream. It is made in Tipperary.

La Magnifique
Hapsburg La Magnifique is a blend made by absinthe specialist Peter Fuss. This limited edition (2000 bottles made) is intended to celebrate the 2010 Artemisia vintage.

Gallery

References 
Strongest Spirits in the World
Hapsburg Absinthe Cassis Flavor Launch for Super Strength Absinthe 
Absinthe Masters 2013 Awards
2013 Awards 
Hapsburg Absinthe Monin 2014 Winner 
Hapsburg Absinthe in Brazil

Absinthes